Keep Doing What You're Doing is the second studio album by Floridian emo band, You Blew It! The album was released through Topshelf Records on January 14, 2014. It was the band's first album to chart, charting on the Billboard 200, Independent Albums and Top Heatseekers. In April and May, the group supported The Early November on their tour of the UK and Europe. In September and October, the band supported Citizen on their headlining US tour. In October and November 2015, the group supported The Wonder Years on their headlining US tour.

Critical reception

Keep Doing What You're Doing has received positive reviews from music critics.

Track listing

Chart positions

Accolades

References 

2014 albums
You Blew It! albums
Topshelf Records albums